Bagre is a Brazilian municipality located in the state of Pará. Its population as of 2020 is estimated to be 31,325 people. The area of the municipality is 4,397.290 km². The city belongs to the mesoregion Marajó and to the microregion of Portel.

References

Municipalities in Pará